Belaya Ramen is a rural locality (a village) in Paustovskoye Rural Settlement, Vyaznikovsky District, Vladimir Oblast, Russia. The population was 12 as of 2010.

Geography 
Belaya Ramen is located on the Indrus River, 43 km south of Vyazniki (the district's administrative centre) by road. Mikhalchugovo is the nearest rural locality.

References 

Rural localities in Vyaznikovsky District